Abdulkadir Abdulla Abdullayev (born 17 July 1988) is an Azerbaijani heavyweight amateur boxer. In 2015 he won a gold medal at the European Games and a bronze at the world championships. He competed at the 2016 Olympics, but was eliminated in the second bout.

References

External links

 
 
 
 

1988 births
Living people
Azerbaijani male boxers
Olympic boxers of Azerbaijan
Boxers at the 2016 Summer Olympics
People from Dagestan
Sportspeople from Dagestan
Boxers at the 2015 European Games
European Games medalists in boxing
European Games gold medalists for Azerbaijan
AIBA World Boxing Championships medalists
Heavyweight boxers
20th-century Azerbaijani people
21st-century Azerbaijani people